Livia Altmann (born 13 December 1994) is a Swiss ice hockey player for Colgate Raiders and the Switzerland women's national ice hockey team.

She has represented Switzerland at the Winter Olympics in 2014 and won the bronze medal after defeating Sweden in the bronze medal playoff.

References

External links

1994 births
Living people
Ice hockey players at the 2014 Winter Olympics
Ice hockey players at the 2018 Winter Olympics
Medalists at the 2014 Winter Olympics
Olympic bronze medalists for Switzerland
Olympic ice hockey players of Switzerland
Olympic medalists in ice hockey
Swiss women's ice hockey defencemen
Colgate Raiders women's ice hockey players
Swiss expatriate ice hockey people
Swiss expatriate sportspeople in the United States